Muhammad bin Saad Al Saud (born 1944) is former deputy governor of Riyadh Province and a member of the House of Saud. He has been in detention since March 2020.

Early life and education
Muhammad bin Saad was born in Riyadh in 1944. His father is the seventh son of King Abdulaziz, Prince Saad. Prince Saad was not given a significant political position due to his weak and negligible character like his half-brother Prince Bandar.

After completing his secondary education in Riyadh, Prince Muhammad went to the United Kingdom to join the Royal Air Force College Cranwell in 1962 and was trained on the aircraft, graduating with a bachelor's degree in military science and aviation. He further joined an advanced flight course, a combat aviation course and then, a fighter interceptor course in the United Kingdom.

Career and other positions
Muhammad bin Saad has both military experience and governmental experience. He began his career as a military officer and served in different branches of the Saudi air force. He was first appointed to the sixth squadron at Khamis Musheet base for lightning aircraft. He, then, served at the Dhahran air base, and his military career lasted until 1975.

From 1984 to 1992, Muhammad bin Saad served as the deputy governor of Al Qassim Province. Then, he was appointed advisor to Prince Nayef bin Abdulaziz, interior minister, in 1992. When Prince Nayef was appointed second deputy prime minister in 2009, Prince Muhammad was appointed his advisor. His tenure lasted until 2011 when he was made deputy governor of the Riyadh Province at the rank of minister. He was relieved of his duty on his request on 14 February 2013 and replaced by Turki bin Abdullah as deputy governor.

Other positions
Prince Muhammad was one of the founders of the Dar Al Maal Al Islami Trust which was initiated by Mohammed bin Faisal Al Saud, King Faisal's son, in 1981. He is a member of the Allegiance Council which was established in 2007.

Personal life
His spouse is Seeta bint Saud, a daughter of King Saud.

Views and arrest
Muhammad bin Saad is one of three members of the Allegiance Council who did not support the appointment of Mohammad bin Salman as crown prince on 21 June 2017. The others were Ahmed bin Abdulaziz Al Saud and Abdulaziz bin Abdullah Al Saud. The latter represented his older brother, Khalid bin Abdullah, at the meeting of the council. Muhammad bin Saad was arrested in March 2020 together with other members of the royal family and senior figures.

References

20th-century Saudi Arabian businesspeople
Muhammad
Muhammad
1944 births
Graduates of the Royal Air Force College Cranwell
Living people
Muhammad
Muhammad
Muhammad
Muhammad